Linwood M. Higgins (born January 11, 1948) is an American politician from Maine. Higgins, a Republican from Scarborough, served 8 terms (1974-1990) in the Maine House of Representatives. From 1980 to 1984, Higgins served as Minority Leader of the Maine House.

References

1948 births
Living people
People from Scarborough, Maine
Maine Republicans
Minority leaders of the Maine House of Representatives